The Squamish Five (sometimes referred to as the Vancouver Five) were a group of self-styled "urban guerrillas" active in Canada during the early 1980s. Their chosen name was Direct Action. The five were Ann Hansen, Brent Taylor, Juliet Caroline Belmas, Doug Stewart and Gerry Hannah.

Campaigns 

The group's first action was in 1982: vandalizing the British Columbia Ministry of Environment offices. They began training with stolen weapons in a deserted area north of Vancouver and stole a large cache of dynamite belonging to the Department of Highways.

On the morning of May 30, 1982, Hansen, Taylor, and Stewart travelled to Vancouver Island and set off a large bomb at the Dunsmuir BC Hydro substation. The damage was extensive, causing over $3 million CAD in damage and leaving four transformers damaged beyond repair.  Nobody was injured.

Litton Industries bombing 

Their target was Litton Industries, a company producing guidance components for the controversial American cruise missiles many feared would increase the risk of nuclear war.

"Wimmin's Fire Brigade" and Red Hot Video firebombing 

The bombers fled Toronto for Vancouver and ceased their activities as they moved underground together. On November 22, 1982, they emerged as part of a larger group under the name "Wimmin's Fire Brigade". They subsequently firebombed three franchises of Red Hot Video, a chain of video pornography stores which had attracted the attention of feminist activists and the local community and was accused of selling snuff films as well as violent and paedophilic pornography. The majority of the stores closed or changed names.

Ann Hansen alleges in her memoirs that the police were surveilling them at the time of the Red Hot Video action, which would mean the police broke the law to get the evidence needed to proceed with the charges on the earlier bombings.

Arrest and trial 
The high-profile crimes attracted major police attention and the Royal Canadian Mounted Police (RCMP) was closing in.  On the morning of January 20, 1983, an RCMP tactical unit disguised as a road crew captured all five on the road to their training area.

Punk band D.O.A released a pair of benefit singles, Right to Be Wild and Burn It Down, for the arrested members.

Legacy 

After prison, Juliet Belmas attended Emily Carr University of Art and Design, and completed a degree in film. She produced independent art films on the conditions of women in prison and was working on her memoirs as of 2012.

In 1988, CBC Television released an award winning docudrama entitled The Squamish Five. The film's cast included Nicky Guadagni as Ann Hansen, Michael McManus as Brent Taylor, Robyn Stevan as Juliet Belmas, Albert Schultz as Doug Stewart, and David McLeod as Gerry Hannah.

See also 
 Action directe – A 1970s and 1980s French urban guerrilla group
 Green anarchism – A branch of anarchism which puts a particular emphasis on environmental issues
 Anarcha-feminism – A branch of anarchism combining anarchism and feminism

References

External links 
 Militant Feminism: An Explosive Interview with and Urban Guerilla Interview with Juliet Belmas in May/June 2010 issue of Earth First! Journal
 The Vancouver Five (aka Direct Action). Includes an interview with Ann Hansen and an essay by a supporter of the Five in Toronto.
 Direct Action: Reflections on Armed Resistance and the Squamish Five, an audio CD recorded by Ann Hansen, presenting information from her book.
 Belmas court records, court sentencing documents relating to Belmas' court trials.
 How nonviolence protects the state, an essay which discusses the legitimacy of violence in civil unrest; the Squamish Five are cited as examples of the effectiveness of the technique.

Defunct anarchist militant groups
Defunct anarchist organizations in North America
Guerrilla organizations
Canadian anarchists
Canadian anti-capitalists
Anti-pornography movements
Organizations based in Vancouver
Quantified groups of defendants
Trials in Canada
Direct action
Terrorism in Canada
Paramilitary organizations based in Canada